Walter Avant "Van" Smith, Jr. (August 17, 1945 - December 5, 2006) was an American costume designer and make-up artist. He worked primarily in the films of John Waters, designing the costumes and make-up for every John Waters film from 1972 to 2004. Because of his work with Waters, he is considered one of the Dreamlanders, Waters' ensemble of regular cast and crew members.

The first John Waters film Smith worked on was Pink Flamingos (1972), for which he designed the costumes and make-up for the film's star, female-impersonating actor Divine, as well as the rest of the cast. In this film Smith, along with Waters, created the famous look for Divine which included a white clown face base and a shaved-back hairline with the eyebrows drawn on the upper forehead. Waters said he wanted Divine's make-up to look like a cross between Jayne Mansfield and Clarabell the Clown.

This was followed by Smith's work on Female Trouble (1974), which featured a cast of flamboyant criminals and hairdressers whose costumes are overtly tacky and whose make-up is extreme. For Divine's wedding scene in the film, Smith designed a see-through wedding dress for the 300 lb. bride.

Smith went on to create the look for the grotesque citizens of Mortville in Desperate Living (1977). In Waters' next seven films, Smith demonstrated the ability to create interesting looks for characters with big personalities but more conventional appearances as Waters' movies became more mainstream.

Smith died of a heart attack in Marianna, Florida on December 5, 2006.

Filmography

Make-up and costume design
Pink Flamingos (1972)
Female Trouble (1974)
Desperate Living (1977)
Polyester (1981)
Hairspray (1988)
Cry-Baby (1990)
Serial Mom (1994)
Pecker (1998)
Cecil B. Demented (2000)
A Dirty Shame (2004)

As himself
Divine Trash (1998)
It Came from Baltimore (2005) (Video)
All the Dirt on A Dirty Shame (2005) (Video)

Other
Pink Flamingos (1972) Birthday party guest in drag
Homicide: Life on the Street (2 episodes, 1993)

References

External links

Van Smith tribute on Dreamland news
The Cinematic Unabomber by Mary Vivian Pearce

American make-up artists
People from Marianna, Florida
1945 births
2006 deaths
American costume designers